Padikkadavan may refer to:
 Padikkadavan (1985 film), an Indian Tamil film starring Sivaji Ganesan and Rajinikanth
 Padikkadavan (2009 film), an Indian Tamil film starring Dhanush